Friendly is a settlement near Sowerby Bridge in Calderdale, West Yorkshire, England, lying on the A646 road in the valley of the River Calder.  It was described in Bartholomew's 1887 Gazetteer of the British Isles as a village 3 miles west of Halifax.

It is the home of The Friendly Band, a brass band founded in 1868, and has two pubs, the White Horse and The Friendly Inn.

Government
The settlement straddles the boundary of the Sowerby Bridge, Warley and Luddenden wards of the Metropolitan borough of Calderdale, part of the Metropolitan county of West Yorkshire.

See also
Listed buildings in Sowerby Bridge

References

Populated places in West Yorkshire
Geography of Calderdale
Sowerby Bridge